Darlene Glória (born March 20, 1943) is a Brazilian actress.

Career

Films

Television

References

External links
 Darlene Glória at IMDb

1943 births
Living people
Brazilian film actresses
Brazilian telenovela actresses